National Highway 752K, commonly referred to as NH 752K is a national highway in  India. It is a spur road of National Highway 52. NH-752K traverses the states of Maharashtra and Karnataka in India.

Route 

Jintur, Bori, Zari, Parbhani, Gangakhed, Isad, Kingaon, Dhanora,Jadhala, WadvalNagnath,Chakur, Gharani, Nalegoan,Latur, Babhalgaon, Nitur, Nilanga, Sirshi, Aurad Shahajani, Bhalki.

Junctions  
 
  Terminal near Jintur.
  Terminal near Parbhani.
  Terminal near Kingaon.
  Terminal near Chakur.
  Terminal near Bhalki.

See also 

 List of National Highways in India
 List of National Highways in India by state

References

External links 

 NH 752K on OpenStreetMap

National highways in India
National Highways in Maharashtra
National Highways in Karnataka